Samyan Mitrtown is a mixed-use shopping, office, residential and leisure development located in Bangkok, Thailand.

History 
The project is situated on a  plot of Chulalongkorn University land on the northwest corner of Sam Yan Intersection, where Phayathai Road meets Rama IV Road. The area was previously a retail neighbourhood that had been cleared for redevelopment in 2008. The project, originally valued at ฿8.5 billion, was announced in 2016 and was developed by Golden Land Property Development, the property arm of the TCC Group owned by Thai billionaire businessman Charoen Sirivadhanabhakdi, under a lease agreement with the university.

Samyan Mitrtown officially opened on 20 September 2019.

Facilities 
Among its facilities include the Samyan CO-OP, a 500-seat reading and working space conceptualized in collaboration with Kasikornbank, which is free to the public and open for 24 hours.

It also has a 24-hour zone which offers several lifestyle services targeting students, workers, foreign tourists and locals with Samyan and its neighboring areas.

Also part of the complex is the Mitrtown Office Tower which features open space and flexible workspaces, the Triple Y Residence and Triple Y Hotel which offers 516 leasehold condominium units and 102 rooms, respectively.

References

External links 

Shopping malls in Bangkok
Pathum Wan district
Shopping malls established in 2019
2019 establishments in Thailand
Property Management of Chulalongkorn University